Jacques Barbeu-Dubourg (12 February 1709 – 14 December 1779) was a French physician, botanist, writer, translator and publisher known for translating Benjamin Franklin's work into French and for inventing a gentlemen's umbrella fitted with a lightning conductor. He designed a method of histographic visualizations which he called the Carte chronographique.

Life
He first embarked on theological studies, but abandoned this to devote his life to science. He studied medicine in Paris and obtained a doctorate in 1748.

He was a keen follower of the work of Benjamin Franklin, and they maintained a regular friendly correspondence. He translated some of Franklin's early experimental work into French in 1762 and published it in Gazette d'Epidaure, his medical journal. He went on to publish his French translation of Franklin's Observations and Experiments in 1773. Barbeu-Dubourg's "umbrella-lightning rod", an umbrella fitted with a tall spike and trailing chain, was designed to give the same protection for gentlemen as was sought by ladies of the time who wore lightning conductors on their hats.

Barbeu-Dubourg was a member of the Royal Society of Medicine in Paris, the Medical Society of London and the American Philosophical Society of Philadelphia. He wrote numerous books and papers, including:
Chronographie, ou Description des tems, contenant toute la suite des souverains de l'univers et des principaux événements de chaque siècle... (Paris, 1753), one of the most ambitious of the chronographic charts produced during that period. The chart was 54 feet long, and mounted on an apparatus with scrolls and cranks to allow the reader to move freely through world history, a device which Barbeu-Dubourg called a "chronographic machine".
Gazette d'Épidaure, ou Recueil de nouvelles de médecine avec des réflexions pour simplifier la théorie et éclairer la pratique (Paris, 1762)
''Le Botaniste françois, comprenant toutes les plantes communes et usuelles... (two volumes, Paris, 1767)
Petit Code de la raison humaine, ou Exposition succincte de ce que la raison dicte à tous les hommes pour éclairer leur conduite et assurer leur bonheur (Paris, 1789)

During the American Revolution the French government appointed Barbeu-Dubourg to act as secret intermediary to offer support to the Americans, but he was soon deemed unsuitable for the task and replaced by Beaumarchais. As Streeter Bass recounts, "He was too old, he lacked business acumen, and – more serious in a venture of this nature – he was insecure and garrulous."

Barbeu-Dubourg wrote the article ″Chronologique″ for the Encyclopédie of Denis Diderot and Jean le Rond d'Alembert.

He died in 1779 in Paris and his ashes were buried in the chapel of Saint-Symphorien church in Saint-Germain-des-Prés.

Carte chronographique
The Chronographie universelle & details qui en dependent pour la Chronologie & les Genealogies abbreviated to Carte chronographique was the first synchronoptical visualisation which attempted to map world history from the Garden of Eden to the Age of Enlightenment.

Gallery

See also
 The Papers of Benjamin Franklin

References

French translators
1709 births
1799 deaths
English–French translators
Translators to French
Contributors to the Encyclopédie (1751–1772)
French people of the American Revolution
Members of the American Philosophical Society
People from Mayenne
Burials at Saint-Germain-des-Prés (abbey)
18th-century French botanists
18th-century French journalists
18th-century French physicians
18th-century French translators